Quijada is a surname. Notable people with the surname include:

Alfonso Quijada Urías (born 1940), Salvadoran poet and author
Brian Quijada, Salvadoran-American actor, playwright, musician and a solo performer
Felipe Flores Quijada (born 1977), Chilean footballer 
Jonathan Quijada (born 1995), Venezuelan volleyball player
José Quijada, Venezuelan baseball player
José Bernardino Quijada (1848-?), Chilean educator
Reinaldo Quijada (born 1959), Venezuelan engineer and politician
Rubert Quijada (born 1989), Venezuelan footballer
John Quijada, creator of Ithkuil.